Sivriler  is a village in Zonguldak District, Kozlu, Turkey.

References

Villages in Zonguldak Central District